Mario Pacilli (born 25 April 1987) is an Italian footballer.

Club career
On 8 September 2021, he signed with Serie C club Taranto.

References

External links
 

1987 births
Living people
Italian footballers
Association football midfielders
People from L'Aquila
Ternana Calcio players
FC Chiasso players
U.S. Avellino 1912 players
Aurora Pro Patria 1919 players
U.C. AlbinoLeffe players
Trapani Calcio players
L'Aquila Calcio 1927 players
U.S. Cremonese players
U.S. Lecce players
Casertana F.C. players
Taranto F.C. 1927 players
Italian expatriate footballers
Expatriate footballers in Switzerland
Italian expatriate sportspeople in Switzerland
Sportspeople from the Province of L'Aquila
Footballers from Abruzzo